Acantuns are ritual stone shafts placed at the four corners of a Yucatec Maya village. When night fell, four Balams (Jaguars) were said to arrive and sit on the idols to keep guard over the village.

References

 
 
 

Maya mythology and religion